Josué Albert (born 21 January 1992) is a professional footballer who plays as a defender. Born in metropolitan France, he plays for the French Guiana national team.

Club career
Albert joined Quevilly-Rouen in 2014, and helped them rise from the Championnat National to the professional Ligue 2. He made his professional debut for Quevilly in a 1–0 Ligue 2 win over Sochaux on 12 January 2018.

International career
Albert was born in France and is of French Guianan descent. He made his international debut for French Guiana in a 2–1 2017 Caribbean Cup qualification loss to Bermuda on 26 March 2016.

References

External links
 
 
 

1992 births
Living people
French people of French Guianan descent
Footballers from Hauts-de-Seine
Sportspeople from Colombes
French Guianan footballers
Association football defenders
AS Saint-Étienne players
Aberystwyth Town F.C. players
En Avant Guingamp players
ES Uzès Pont du Gard players
US Quevilly-Rouen Métropole players
Clermont Foot players
Ligue 1 players
Ligue 2 players
Championnat National players
Championnat National 2 players
Championnat National 3 players
French Guiana international footballers
French Guianan expatriate footballers
Expatriate footballers in Wales